"Silly Boy (She Doesn't Love You)" is a song written by Dave Burgess and Marnie Thomas. It was recorded by The Lettermen in 1962 for their album Jim, Tony, and Bob.

Background
The lyrics describe the singer's inability to move on after an amorous relationship ends.

Chart performance
In 1962, "Silly Boy (She Doesn't Love You)" was released as a single. It became a minor hit on the Billboard Hot 100, reaching number 81.

References

The Lettermen songs
1962 singles
Capitol Records singles
1962 songs